Albinospila is a genus of moths in the family Geometridae.

Species
 Albinospila floresaria (Walker, 1866)
 Albinospila laticostata Warren
 Albinospila ornatifimbria Warren
 Albinospila oxycentra Meyrick
 Albinospila rhodostigma Warren
 Albinospila syntyche Prout

References
 Albinospila at Markku Savela's Lepidoptera and some other life forms

Hemitheini
Geometridae genera